Warren Farm is a 61-acre plot of Metropolitan Open Land located in Norwood Green (Southall) that was previously used as playing fields by local schools. The site is also host to out of use changing rooms and pavilions. After falling out of use, it is now a wildflower meadow.

History 
As the name suggests, Warren Farm was initially a farm which was acquired by the London County Council in the 1960s. Control was handed over to Ealing Council in 1990. 

In October 2017, wheelie bins stored at Warren Farm caught fire leading to a response of 10 fire engines as well as “70 firefighters and officers.”

QPR 
Queen’s Park Rangers announced that the site was their desired site for a new first team training facility, with QPR proposing to build a two storey training centre and three storey operations building as well as other further buildings. In addition, they planned to build 11 football pitches and “3 cricket wickets” as well as over 400 car parking spaces. Ealing Council granted them planning permission. Legal challenges were issued by local residents, with the final appeal being rejected by the Supreme Court. However nearly 10 years after first announcing their intention, QPR stated they no longer preferred for Warren Farm to be the site of a training ground instead moving to a site in Heston.

Campaign for Nature Reserve Status 
As QPR pursued their plans, Warren Farm naturally re-wilded. Local residents opposed to development plans and the Brent River and Canal Society proposed and petitioned for the area to gain Local Nature Reserve status with their campaign gaining over 3,000 signatures in the first week. The petition went on to gain over 10,000 signatures.

Plans for Sports Facilities 
Ealing Council announced their intention to use part of the area to build facilities for sports whilst also wanting to preserve the nature that had grown stating “We want to develop plans for this space for people both to enjoy nature and preserve its wild character and provide sports facilities for local people.” A consultation was opened which was welcomed by Southall FC who had identified the site as suitable for their club.

References 

Parks and open spaces in the London Borough of Ealing
London Borough of Ealing
Nature